Rudy Rotta (Villadossola, 14 October 1950 – Verona, 3 July 2017) was a Swiss-Italian blues guitarist and vocalist.

Biography
Rodolfo "Rudy" Rotta was born in Villadossola, Italy, in 1950, and grew up in Lucerne, Switzerland where his family emigrated. He started playing guitar and performing in Switzerland at the age of 14, but eventually returned to Verona, where he founded the Rudy's Blues Band. Over his career, he played with a number of well-known blues artists including Brian Auger, John Mayall, Robben Ford and Peter Green. Rotta died on 3 July 2017 in Verona after an illness.

Albums
 1990 - Reason to Live 1990 Alabianca - EMI (1991 EMI / Toshiba Japan)
 1991 - Diabolic Live Hot Fok's / In-Akustic – CD
 1991 - Blues Greatest Hits Hot Fok's / In-Akustic – CD registered in Chicago
 1995 - So di Blues Rossodisera / Sony Music – CD
 1997 - Live in Kansas City Acoustic Music Records- CD
 1998 - Loner and Goner Alabianca / EMI – CD
 1998 - Real Live LMJ – Vinyl
 1999 - Blurred Acoustic Music Records - CD
 1999 - Montreux Festival 'with other artists - CD
 2001 - The Beatles in Blues Azzurra Music – CD
 2004 - Some of My Favorite Songs Pepper Cake-ZYX - CD
 2004 - Springtime Blues with other artists – CD
 2005 - Captured Live with Brian Auger Pepper Cake-ZYX – CD
 2006 - Winds of Louisiana Pepper Cake-ZYX - CD registered in New Orleans
 2009 - Blue Inside Pepper Cake-ZYX - CD registrato in studio ad Imola (Italy), e live a Winterthur (CH) e Castelfranco Emilia (Modena Italy)
 2011 - Me, My Music and My Life Pepper Cake-ZYX - CD

References

External links
Rudy Rotta.com

1950 births
2017 deaths
Italian blues guitarists
Italian blues musicians
People from the Province of Verbano-Cusio-Ossola